The Monte Massone, at an elevation of , is a mountain of the Pennine Alps in North-western Italy.

Geography

The mountain belongs to the water divide between Strona Valley (South) and Ossola Valley (North). The southern slopes of Monte Massone are mainly grassy, while its North face is rocky, very steep and covered by shrubs. From Ornavasso, located on its North foothill, the summit can't be seen because is hidden by a subsummit named Eyehorn (2,131 m). On Monte Massone stands a metallic cross 4 ms high bearing a bell, which was located there in 1921. Not far from it, on the Northern slopes of the mountain, can be seen some trenches dug before the 1st World War and belonging to the Linea Cadorna. At 1,900 m, on the Valle Strona side of Monte Massone, there is a small plateau which hosts three tiny lakes called  Laghetti, where in the past local farmers tried to implement a project of land reclamation.

SOIUSA classification 
According to the SOIUSA (International Standardized Mountain Subdivision of the Alps) the mountain can be classified in the following way:
 main part = Western Alps
 major sector = North Western Alps
 section = Pennine Alps
 subsection = Eastern Aosta and Northern Valsesia Alps
 supergroup = Contrafforti valsesiani del Monte Rosa
 group = Costiera Punta Grober-Tagliaferro-Montevecchio
 subgroup = Contrafforte Montevecchio-Quarazzola-Capezzone
 code = I/B-9.III-C.7.b/b

Geology

Inside the mountain lay some marble veins and gold, iron and copper deposits.

Access to the summit 

The Monte Massone is one of the most popular hiking destinations of the low Ossola Valley. Its summit can be reached by foothpath from the Valle Strona starting from Alpe Loccia (close to the village of Chesio, in the comune of Loreglia), or from Val d'Ossola starting from Cortevecchio (Ornavasso), or even from the Alpe Quaggione (Germagno).

Mountain huts
 Rifugio Oliva - Brusa Perona Renato, managed by the Club Alpino Italiano section of Gravellona Toce.

References

Bibliography

Maps

External links 
 Normal route description on </ref>.

Mountains of the Alps
Mountains of Piedmont
Pennine Alps
Two-thousanders of Italy